The "State Anthem of the Republic of Belarus", better known as "" ("We, Belarusians"), is the national anthem of Belarus. It was originally written in the 1940s and adopted in 1955 for use in the Byelorussian Soviet Socialist Republic. The music of the Byelorussian SSR's regional anthem was composed by Niescier Sakałoŭski and the lyrics were written by Michas Klimkovič. After the dissolution of the Soviet Union, the music composed by Sakalowski was kept and the lyrics were discarded. New lyrics, which were written by Klimkovič and Uladzimir Karyzna, were adopted by a presidential decree issued on 2 July 2002.

Evolution

Anthem of the Byelorussian SSR 

"" was originally used as the anthem of the Byelorussian Soviet Socialist Republic starting from 24 February 1955. The original anthem was composed by Sakałoŭski and the lyrics were written by Maxim Klimkovich. It was presented in front of a jury in 1944, but it took 11 years of modifications before it was officially adopted. When Belarus became an independent country, the national anthem was modified to drop the Communist-era lyrics. An attempt was made in 1995 to adopt Natallia Arsiennieva's poem "O God Almighty" as the national anthem, but the suggestion was not acted on even though it was supported by a parliamentary committee.

Anthem of the Republic of Belarus 

The only legal mention of a national anthem in Belarusian law before 2002 was in the Constitution of the Republic of Belarus. Section One, Article 19 of the constitution states that "The symbols of the Republic of Belarus as a sovereign state shall be its national flag, national emblem and national anthem." While the constitution only mentioned the use of the flag, national anthem, and arms as state symbols, each symbol had to be defined by law. A law specifying a national anthem was not enacted until Presidential Decree 350 took effect on 18 July 2002, the day before Belarus's independence day. The decree's main objective was to establish lyrics for the anthem and introduce musical notation along with the new lyrics. Moreover, the decree designated when, where, and how the anthem was to be performed.

According to the newspaper Soviet Byelorussia, President Lukashenko decided on the anthem on 12 June 2002 and chose to have its first performance on 3 July—Belarusian independence day, the anniversary of the date in 1944 when the Wehrmacht was driven away from Minsk by the Red Army. However, the first performance actually took place on 2 July at a concert organized by the government as part of the Belarusian independence festivities.

When Lukashenko issued his decree selecting a new national anthem, only slight changes were made to the Soviet-era hymn. While the references to Russia, the Communist Party of the Soviet Union and Vladimir Lenin were replaced; the overall theme of "friendship of peoples" and the original music composed by Sakałoŭski were preserved. The government decided to keep Sakałoŭski's music in order to maintain historical continuity, and also on account of its popularity and musical quality. After the national anthem was adopted, the process of adopting national symbols was completed.

Reaction 
The organization Freedom House commented on the adoption of the anthem in a report about the country, published in 2003. On page 125 of the "Country Report of Belarus", Freedom House says that President Lukashenko has "reintroduced the state symbols used by the old Byelorussian Soviet Socialist Republic. In 2002, the president approved a streamlined version of the Soviet-era anthem "" ("We Belarusians"), as the country's new national anthem." The report also mentioned President Lukashenko's ban of the symbols that were used since Belarus's independence in 1991, such as the Pahonia arms and the white, red, white flag, which Lukashenko claims are associated with fascism (because the pro-Nazi Belarusian Central Rada in World War II used these symbols). In 2003, Dr. Taras Kuzio wrote in Radio Free Europe that President Lukashenko "is the quintessential Soviet Belarusian patriot who presides over a regime steeped in Soviet nostalgia." Kuzio said that the motives of Russia and Belarus in re-adopting Soviet-era symbols are part of restoring that nostalgia.

Usage and regulations 
The anthem must be performed in accordance with the lyrics and sheet music established by law. Each day, all national free to air radio stations and television networks across the country are required to play it twice; at 06:00 when going on air and again at 00:00 upon going off air. The anthem can also be performed on certain occasions, such as at government meetings, before sporting events and presidential inaugurations. While the anthem is being performed, citizens are required to stand at attention and those in military or police uniform must to be in Full Russian-style hand salute (if not in formation).

National anthem proposals

Vajacki Marš

"Vajacki Marš" (March of the Warriors) was the official anthem of the Belarusian Democratic Republic, a Belarusian state that was created in 1918 but lasted only 10 months, during World War I.

Since 1919, the song has been used as an anthem of Belarus by Belarusian emigrant communities in Western Europe and North America. It is still considered the official anthem used by the government-in-exile of the Belarusian Democratic Republic.

Mahutny Boža 

Mahutny Boža, a religious hymn, is also actively used by those who oppose the Lukashenko Government.

Pahonia 
The song Pahonia, based on the poem by Maksim Bahdanovich and set to music by Mikalay Shchahlou-Kulikovich, has been performed acapella during the 2020 Belarusian protests and experienced a resurged popularity following them.

Young Belarus 
A favourite in the anthem competition was the poem called Young Belarus (Маладая Беларусь) by Janka Kupala. However, the poem was never set to a musical composition, so Young Belarus could not be selected as the anthem.

Lyrics

Belarusian lyrics

Translations

Notes

References

External links

Скачать гимн Республики Беларусь
Belarus: My Belarusy – Audio of the national anthem of Belarus, with information and lyrics

European anthems
Belarusian music
National symbols of Belarus
National anthems
National anthem compositions in F major
Belarusian-language songs